André Gabriel Matias (born 11 September 1987) is a Portuguese football player of Mozambican descent who plays for Almancilense.

Club career
He made his professional debut in the Segunda Liga for Fátima on 22 January 2011 in a game against Gil Vicente.

References

1987 births
People from Portimão
Portuguese people of Mozambican descent
Living people
Portuguese footballers
Louletano D.C. players
S.C. Olhanense players
C.D. Fátima players
Liga Portugal 2 players
Atlético Clube de Portugal players
Portimonense S.C. players
S.C. Farense players
Taranto F.C. 1927 players
Portuguese expatriate footballers
Expatriate footballers in Italy
S.R. Almancilense players
Association football forwards
Sportspeople from Faro District